Igatpuri (Pronunciation: [iɡət̪puɾiː]; formerly known as Egutpoora) is a town and a Hill Station. It is also a municipal council in Nashik District in the Indian state of Maharashtra. It is located in the Western Ghats. Igatpuri railway station lies in Nashik District between Mumbai and Nashik Road on the Central Railway. Igatpuri is known for Vipassana International Academy, where ancient technique of meditation is taught called Vipassana. The place is one of the best places to visit in Maharashtra in monsoon. It is a hill station on busy Mumbai-Agra NH-3 only 45 km from Nashik and 130 km from Mumbai.

Igatpuri railway station is a major railway station connecting Igatpuri to Mumbai.
The station is known for its surrounding scenery, wada pao and idlis sold by vendors to commuters traveling in the train.
The exit of Igatpuri railway station signals the proximity of Mumbai on down route.

Igatpuri is surrounded by the highest peaks in Sahyadri i.e. Western Ghats, most of them are forts built in Satavahana dynasty. It's heavenly for trekkers and hikers, Most Indian (Hindi) movie outdoor scenes specially songs are shot in Igatpuri region. Igatpuri is a place of significance in terms of Vipassana meditation. The International Centre for Vipassana meditation called Dhammagiri, supposedly the largest Vipassana Center, is located here. This region consists of those mountains which are accessed by trains going from Mumbai CST to Kasara and Igatpuri. Local trains only go up to Kasara, and don't climb the Thal Ghat from Kasara to Igatpuri. Hence to go to Igatpuri, one has to either take a long distance train or reach Kasara by a suburban train and then take a bus uphill.

Geography
It has an average elevation of 600 metres.

Average annual rainfall in Igatpuri is 3498mm.

Demographics
 India census, Igatpuri had a population of 31,572. Males constitute 52% of the population and females 48%. Igatpuri has an average literacy rate of 74%, higher than the national average of 59.5%: male literacy is 80%, and female literacy is 67%. In Igatpuri, 14% of the population is under 6 years of age. People of Agri community can be found in the city, they are also called Patharvat.

Accessibility
Igatpuri is well connected by rail and road. By NH-3 to Agra and by, Central Railway to Mumbai, Howrah, Guwahati, New Delhi, etc. It is a major railway station, As Loco Changes are made here for trains from and to Mumbai.

Tourism
Tourism is the most significant segment of the Igatpuri's economy. Following are the places most visited by tourists :

Bhatsa River Valley: The Bhatsa river valley is situated at the end of the Thal Ghat, just before entering Igatpuri from Mumbai. The valley lies in the basin of the majestic Bhatsa River.

Arthur Lake: A few km from Igatpuri, lies a huge and placid Arthur Lake, set like a huge jewel amidst the dense greenery. The lake is formed by the waters of the Pravara River in the Bhandardara region.

Kalsubai Peak About 35 km from Igatpuri is the highest peak in the Sahyadri ranges.

Amruteshwar Temple: Built in 11th century AD, it is dedicated to Lord Shiva. Constructed in a distinct Hemadpanti style, the temple is surrounded by lush green fields and Mount Kalsubai the highest mountain in Maharashtra. From here a further excursion leads to the Ratangad Fort. One can access this temple by road or an 8 km boat ride on Arthur Lake. 

Dhamma Giri Meditation Centre: Founded by S.N.Goenka, Dhammagiri is a meditation centre offers courses in Vipasana (insight meditation) a technique taught by the Buddha in India, 2,500 years ago. The large Golden Pagoda, the central theme of Dhammagiri serves as a landmark for Igatpuri. The centre attracts a lots of people from various parts of India as well as abroad. More on Dhammagiri, visit at www.giri.dhamma.org

Ghatandevi Temple: Just ahead of Igatpuri, after crossing the camel Valley, comes across a small road, which leads to the Ghatandevi temple. According to the locals belief, Ghatandevi is the Protector of Ghats. The mountains of Durrar Utvad, Trimak and Harihar forms a spectacular backdrop. Behind the temple lies the Tringalwadi Fort.

Girisagar Waterfall: This majestic waterfall near the beautiful Bhavali dam greets you to enjoy its timeless beauty amidst the fog and lush green forests. There are a ton of top attractions in close proximity of the falls and a viewpoint just above provides a great view of the Sahyadris. The waterfall is 17 km from Igatpuri train station, inside Jamunda Hills.

Igatpuri Cemetery It lies on a hillock, North of the town. Soldiers died while fighting the great war in India are buried here.

Tringalwadi Fort: It is situated at an altitude of 3,000 feet above the sea level. Since it is located very high, the fort offers views of the locality, including Kulang and Kalsubai mountain ranges. The fort attracts trekkers also. The top of the fort is shaped like a Turban. A temple dedicated to lord Hanuman is nearby. An architectural marvel, the fort can be accessed through a narrow pathway, down to the Tringalwadi Lake. Just a few km away from Tringalwadi Lake is Talegaon Lake formed by the small Talegaon Dam.

Camel Valley: A few metres away from Bhatsa river valley, on the right is the camel valley. On the other side of the valley is a waterfall formed by the rain waters and one have to walk over and look down to find a slope that falls over 1, 000 ft. The waterfall is the chief attraction of this place.

The Five Waterfalls: A little further from Ghatandevi, the rough road leading to the railway line begins. Across the railway line, while climbing down, falling one below the other, are five waterfalls that form which are main attraction for tourists in Igatpuri.

Schools in Igatpuri

Holy Family Convent High School (English).
Mahatama Gandhi High School (Marathi, Semi-English); .
Wonderland High School and Junior College (English) (C.B.S.E) from 2019.

Panchavati English Medium School and Junior College (C.B.S.E.), NH.3.
Janta Vidyalaya and Junior College (Marathi).
K.P.G. Arts, Commerce & Science College, Igatpuri.
V. N. Patil Madhyamik Va Uchcha Madhyamik Mahavidyalaya (Arts & Science)

NSPM Arts & Commerce.
 
GSTMahavidyalaya, Igatpuri.

References

External links

 Igatpuri_Plateau
 Igatpuri Travel Guide

Cities and towns in Nashik district
Hill stations in Maharashtra
Talukas in Maharashtra